The Civic Tower of Varese or Littoria Tower is a square-shape tower, designed and built in the Fascist period. It is part of Piazza Monte Grappa.

It was designed by the Roman architect Mario Loreti and inaugurated in 1933, as part of the construction of Piazza Monte Grappa at the promotion of Varese as the provincial capital.

Gallery

References

Towers in Italy
Buildings and structures in Varese
Fascist architecture